The Royal District Nursing Service (RDNS) is a not-for-profit community health and care provider with headquarters in Keswick, a suburb of Adelaide, South Australia.

It was established in 1894 in South Australia as the District Trained Nursing Society (DTNS). It was renamed the District and Bush Nursing Society of South Australia in 1937; in 1965 it became the Royal District and Bush Nursing Society of South Australia and in 1973 the Royal District Nursing Society of South Australia. In 1993 its name changed to Royal District Nursing Service of SA.

In 2011 the organisation merged with Silver Chain, and is now known as RDNS in South Australia and Silver Chain throughout the rest of Australia.

History

The Royal District Nursing Society of South Australia, initially the District Trained Nursing Society (D.T.N.S.), was inaugurated on 12 July 1894 following 12 months work by a trained nurse in the Adelaide suburb of Bowden. This experiment, which was financed by the philanthropic Barr Smith and Elder families, had convinced founders, Dr. Allan Campbell, Rev. B.C. Stephenson and Nightingale nurse Matron Edith Noble, of the local demand for a district nursing service. Meanwhile, the financial viability of such a venture was being demonstrated by the Pirie Street Nursing Sisters' Association, which was organised by the inner-city Pirie Street Wesleyan Methodist Church but supported by public donations. Founder Rev. Joseph Berry was on the inaugural committee of the D.T.N.S., although his Pirie Street Nursing Sisters' Association remained independent until 1898.

Subsequently, in 1937, the D.T.N.S. was renamed the District and Bush Nursing Society of S.A. Inc.; in 1965 the 'Royal' prefix was granted and in 1973 'Bush' was removed from the title.

In 1993 its name changed to Royal District Nursing Service of SA.

In September 2011, RDNS merged with the Silver Chain Nursing Association of Western Australia. Due to the strong history of RDNS within South Australia, the RDNS name and branding continues to be used within that state.

Locations
RDNS provides care within local communities and as such has bases located throughout Adelaide.

See also

Royal District Nursing Service (Victoria)

References

External links
RDNS Website
RDNS Video

Nursing organisations in Australia